Michael Joseph Wilkinson (born October 1, 1981) is an American former professional basketball player.

Amateur career
Wilkinson attended Wisconsin Heights High School, where he played basketball for the Vanguards. In his senior year, Wilkinson earned the Mr. Basketball award, which is the player of the year award in Wisconsin high school basketball.

Wilkinson played college basketball for the Wisconsin Badgers from 2001 to 2005, redshirting his freshman year, for a total of five years with the basketball program. He averaged 14.3 points per game and was selected to the All-Big Ten Conference First Team his senior year. He was just the second player to finish his playing career with at least 1,500 points and 800 rebounds at Wisconsin.

Pro career
After playing in Greece, Russia and Turkey, Wilkinson joined Euroleague team UNICS for two seasons. On January 23, 2014, he signed a contract with Levski Sofia for the rest of the season.

National team
He has been granted a Macedonian citizenship and is known as Majkl Vilkinson (Мајкл Вилкинсон in Cyrillic) and he also played for the national basketball team.

References

External links

Eurocup Profile
FIBA.com Profile
Khimki Profile
TBL profile
BG Basket profile
Levski Sofia Video

1981 births
Living people
American expatriate basketball people in Bulgaria
American expatriate basketball people in Greece
American expatriate basketball people in Russia
American expatriate basketball people in Turkey
Aris B.C. players
Basketball players from Wisconsin
BC Khimki players
BC Levski Sofia players
BC UNICS players
Galatasaray S.K. (men's basketball) players
Macedonian men's basketball players
PBC Lokomotiv-Kuban players
People from Blue Mounds, Wisconsin
Power forwards (basketball)
Wisconsin Badgers men's basketball players
American men's basketball players